Orly Klínger (born 10 October 1956) is an Ecuadorian footballer. He played in 22 matches for the Ecuador national football team from 1981 to 1985. He was also part of Ecuador's squad for the 1983 Copa América tournament.

References

1956 births
Living people
Ecuadorian footballers
Ecuador international footballers
Association football defenders
Sportspeople from Esmeraldas, Ecuador